Bob's Pink Cadillac is a double album by bassist and composer William Parker's Clarinet Trio, clarinetist Perry Robinson and drummer Walter Perkins, which was recorded in the studio in January 2000 and live at Tonic in August 2001 and released on the Eremite label.

Reception

In his review for AllMusic, David Dupont states "The trio session offers plenty of room for unfettered blowing, and each member takes full advantage of the format".

Track listing
All compositions by William Parker

Disc One: 
 "Bob's Pink Cadillac" – 13:55  
 "Overcoat in the River" – 10:40  
 "Blue Flower" – 18:26  
 "Fence in the Snow" – 28:44

Disc Two: 
 "Ebony Fantasy I" – 14:40  
 "Ebony Fantasy II" – 13:49  
 "Ebony Fantasy III" – 9:54  
 "Ebony Fantasy IV" – 11:45  
 "Ebony Fantasy V" – 8:38

Personnel
William Parker – bass, gralle, orchestra bells, jogibaba, vocals 
 Perry Robinson – clarinet, ocarina
Walter Perkins – trap drums, vocals

References

2002 albums
William Parker (musician) albums
Eremite Records albums